Promise Island (Inuktitut: Nannuyuma; meaning: "polar bear") is located near the western shore of Hudson Bay. It is barely a square kilometre in area and rises  in elevation on its northern side.

The island is home to a wide range of wildlife, including the Arctic fox (alopex lagopus innuitus), the harbour seal (phoca hispida), the polar bear, the brown lemming (lemmus t. trimucronatus), the barren-ground caribou (rangifer arcticus), and the red phalarope.

References

Islands of Hudson Bay
Uninhabited islands of Kivalliq Region